The Ministry of Charles-Maurice de Talleyrand-Périgord was formed on 9 July 1815 after the second Bourbon Restoration under King Louis XVIII of France. 
It replaced the French Provisional Government of 1815 that had been formed when Napoleon abdicated after the Battle of Waterloo.
The cabinet was dissolved on 26 September 1815 and replaced by the First ministry of Armand-Emmanuel du Plessis de Richelieu.

Formation and actions
The Prince of Talleyrand was again called to form a government by Louis XVIII, after the arrival of the King in Saint-Denis on 7 July.

Talleyrand formally formed his government on 9 July, keeping for himself the office of Minister of Foreign Affairs. The cabinet was composed mainly of Doctrinaires, liberal royalists who formed a moderate group inside the Chamber of Deputies, opposed to the more radical Ultras.

However, after 2 months and 17 days, Tallayrand resigned for three reasons:
 His refusal to sign the Second Treaty of Paris, considered too humiliating for France despite the conditions of peace negotiated during the Congress of Vienna.
 The pressure exercised on Louis XVIII by Tsar Alexander I, who disliked the presence of many ex-Bonapartists in the new government, and called for the creation of a conservative government
 The results of the August elections, that permitted the creation a parliamentary majority of Ultras (350 out of 400 seats), who were hostile to ex-Bonapartists Talleyrand and Minister Joseph Fouché, a regicide who was ousted from office in September 1815 and exiled.

Ministers

Notes

References

Sources

French governments
1815 establishments in France
1815 disestablishments in France
Cabinets established in 1815
Cabinets disestablished in 1815